Giuseppe Troni (Portuguese: José Troni; Turin, 1739 – Lisbon, 1810) was an Italian court painter. He was initially a pupil of his father, Alessandro Trono, but completed his studies in Rome. He was portrait painter to the court of Naples, and later to the court in Turin.

Portuguese court 
In 1785, he moved to Lisbon. In Lisbon, he would become famous once he became a court painter to the House of Braganza. He would paint there many famous portraits of the kings and princes of Portugal, as well as the Portuguese nobility.

Gallery

References

1739 births
1810 deaths
Painters from Turin
18th-century Italian painters
Italian male painters
19th-century Italian painters
Painters at the Portuguese royal court
19th-century Italian male artists
18th-century Italian male artists